The 2010 season of 2. deild karla is the 45th season of second-tier football in Iceland.

Stadia and locations

League table

Results
Each team play every opponent once home and away for a total of 22 matches.

Top scorers

References

2. deild karla seasons
Iceland
Iceland
3